The cruise missiles strike on Iraq in June 1993 were ordered by U.S. President Bill Clinton as both a retaliation and a warning triggered by the attempted assassination by alleged Iraqi intelligence agents on former U.S. President George H. W. Bush while on a visit to Kuwait from 14–16 April 1993.

On June 27, 1993, 23 Tomahawk cruise missiles were launched by two U.S. Navy warships into downtown Baghdad. These hit a building which was believed to be the headquarters of the Iraqi Intelligence Service in the Mansour district of Baghdad. Iraq claimed that nine civilians were killed in the attack and three civilian houses destroyed.

George H. W. Bush assassination plot
On the night of 13 April 1993, a day before George H. W. Bush was scheduled to visit Kuwait City to commemorate the international coalition victory against Iraq in the Persian Gulf War, Kuwaiti authorities arrested 14 persons suspected in the plot to kill Bush using explosives hidden in a Toyota Landcruiser.

The Kuwaitis recovered the Landcruiser, which contained between 80 and 90 kilograms of plastic explosives, composed mostly of RDX, connected to a detonator (called the "Bush device" in an FBI laboratory report). They also recovered ten cube-shaped plastic explosive devices with detonators (called "cube bombs" in an FBI laboratory report) from the Landcruiser.

Investigators from the FBI, Secret Service, and other agencies traveled to Kuwait immediately after the arrests were made public. The Clinton administration said it would consider action against Iraq if it had positive proof of Iraqi complicity in an assassination attempt.

Responsible party 
Clinton was convinced the attack was masterminded by the Iraqi Intelligence Service by three pieces of evidence. First, the suspects in the plot made detailed confessions to FBI agents in Kuwait, including two alleged leaders of the plot, Ra'ad Asadi and Wali Abdelhadi Ghazali, both of whom were Iraqi nationals. Asadi stated that he was responsible for directing the car bomb, while Ghazali said that he would have been responsible for detonating the bomb to kill Bush. Second, FBI bomb experts linked the captured 175-pound car bomb found in Kuwait City to previous explosives made in Iraq. Third, intelligence assessments noted that Iraqi President Saddam Hussein had publicly threatened Bush, including promising to hunt down and punish Bush on Iraqi official media, even after Bush left office. 

An analysis by the CIA's Counterterrorism Mission Center from May 13, 1993 claimed that Kuwaiti authorities possibly "cooked the books" on the assassination plot. CIA analysts stated that the Kuwaiti government may have used the discovery of an unrelated Iraqi weapons smuggling plot to project a plot against Bush. They noted that some of the evidence, including explosive devices matching those used in Iraqi operations, definitely pointed to Iraqi involvement. However, they were unable to corroborate the Kuwaiti assertion that the plot was aimed at Bush. US officials described the report as an "interim report" and suggested subsequent FBI operations left open the possibility that there had indeed been an Iraqi plot on Bush's life. In October 1993, New Yorker investigative journalist Seymour Hersh assailed the U.S. government’s case as "seriously flawed." He noted that seven experts in electronic engineering and explosives who saw photographs of the explosive device in Kuwait and a known Iraqi device told him that "both were generic equipment without unique characteristics." Hersh also said that some of the suspected bombers disavowed their confessions and claimed that they had been beaten.

In 1994, ten Iraqis and three Kuwaitis were convicted and sentenced for their roles in the plot, including five Iraqis and one Kuwaiti who were sentenced to death. One defendant was acquitted during the trial. Ghazali was the only defendant to plead guilty and was one of the individuals sentenced to death. He stated after his sentencing that he attempted to assassinate Bush as revenge for the Persian Gulf War and his family, claiming that 16 family members were killed by Bush's actions. In March 1995, Kuwait's top appeals court upheld two of the death sentences, while commuting the death sentences for three Iraqis to life imprisonment and setting aside the death penalty conviction of one Kuwaiti for a lower charge resulting in five years imprisonment.

Cruise missile attack on Baghdad

Between 1AM and 2AM local time on 26 June/June 27, 1993, 23 Tomahawk cruise missiles were launched by two U.S. Navy warships into downtown Baghdad. These hit a building which was believed to be the headquarters of the Iraqi Intelligence Service in the Mansour district of Baghdad. Iraq claimed that nine civilians were killed in the attack and three civilian houses destroyed. The missiles were fired from the destroyer  in the Red Sea and the cruiser  in the Persian Gulf.

U.S. Secretary of Defense Les Aspin, stated in a June 27, 1993, interview with The Washington Post:
"What we're doing is sending a message against the people who were responsible for planning this operation. . . . {If} anybody asks the same people to do it again, they will remember this message."

See also
 January 1993 airstrikes on Iraq
1996 cruise missile strikes on Iraq
 1998 bombing of Iraq
 Operation Infinite Reach

References

External links
 How Do We Know that Iraq Tried to Assassinate President George H.W. Bush?
 Plot by Baghdad to Assassinate Bush Is Questioned
 So, Did Saddam Hussein Try to Kill George W.  Bush's Dad? - by Jim Lobe
 US Air Strike Against the Iraqi Intelligence Headquarters – 1993 - A Legal Analysis - by Paulina Starski

1993 in Iraq
Conflicts in 1993
Airstrikes conducted by the United States
20th-century military history of the United States
Iraq–United States military relations
June 1993 events in Asia
Presidency of Bill Clinton